Rock Creek, Illinois may refer to:
Rock Creek, Adams County, Illinois, an unincorporated community in Adams County, Illinois
Rock Creek, Hardin County, Illinois, an unincorporated community in Hardin County, Illinois
Rock Creek-Lima Township, Carroll County, Illinois, a township in Carrol County, Illinois
Rock Creek No. 12 Precinct, Menard County, Illinois, a precinct in Menard County, Illinois